Clapgate Pits is a disused quarry near Broughton, Lincolnshire. This  site has been managed by Lincolnshire Wildlife Trust since 1996. It provides an environment for several plants  which are rare in Lincolnshire: pale St John's-Wort, Squinancywort and Wall Germander. Until 1969 it  was the most northerly site in Britain for Pasqueflower but these plants were apparently dug up by vandals.

Mammals
The following mammals have been recorded in Clapgate Pits:
 Brown hare (Lepus europaeus)
 Grey squirrel (Sciurus carolinensis)
 Reeves's muntjac (Muntiacus reevesi)
 Roe deer (Capreolus capreolus)

References

Nature reserves in Lincolnshire
Tourist attractions in Lincolnshire
Lincolnshire Wildlife Trust